Si Satchanalai National Park (Thai อุทยานแห่งชาติศรีสัชนาลัย) is a national park in Thailand.

Description
The Si Satchanalai National Park lies in Si Satchanalai and Thung Saliam districts of Sukhothai Province, the North of Thailand.

The general geography of the national park is the complex mountains of the southern end of the Phi Pan Nam Range, lying along north–south direction, looking like a flank surrounding it, some are rocky mountains and among the high mountains in the western part, there are high cliffs, such as Doi Mae Wang Chang and Doi Mae Mok. The height of this area is between 300 and 1200 m above mean sea level. The steep slope of the ranges is an advantage for protecting the forests from being destroyed and occupied by local people.

These mountains are the source of many streams such as Huai Sai Khao, Huai Mae Tha Phae, Huai Mae San, Huai Pha Cho, Huai Manao, among others. There are some flatland areas along the shore of Huai Chang and Yom River.

History
Si Satchanai National Park is the place of historical located in Thung Saliam district, Sukhothai Province. Previously, it was called Mueang Chaliang. The Royal Forest Department proclaimed it a National Park on May 8, 1981, as Thailand's 26th National Park. The total area is 133,250 rai ~ . The park consists of rich forest that provide an important watershed for the surrounding agricultural area.

See also
List of national parks of Thailand
List of Protected Areas Regional Offices of Thailand

References

External links
Si Satchanalai National Park 
National Park Division
Si Satchanalai Informations and History  (Thai:Translation ready)

Geography of Sukhothai province
National parks of Thailand
Tourist attractions in Sukhothai province
Protected areas established in 1981
1981 establishments in Thailand
Phi Pan Nam Range